Gailītis (feminine: Gailīte) is a Latvian masculine surname, a diminutive of the word gailis, meaning "rooster/cockerel".

Individuals with the surname include:

 (1900–1980), Latvian politician 
 (bon 1949), Latvian theatre director
Jānis Gailītis (born 1985), Latvian basketball player and coach
Kārlis Gailītis (1936–1992), Latvian Lutheran archbishop 
 (1882–1942), Latvian politician 
 (1869—1943), Layvian Lutheran clergyman, politician and public figure

References

Latvian-language masculine surnames